Aethes mordax is a species of moth of the family Tortricidae. It is found in Argentina and Brazil (Parana, Minas Gerais).

References

Moths described in 1917
mordax
Moths of South America